Star Trek: Starfleet Academy was a comic book series published by Marvel Comics in the United States, running for 19 issues from December 1996 until June 1998. Along with Star Trek: Early Voyages, the two were the most popular of Marvel's brief stint of Star Trek publishing. The series ends with several plot points unresolved and a glimpse into the future.

Summary
Following approximately six months behind the television continuity, the series follows the adventures of Omega Squad, a group of cadets formed at Starfleet Academy in San Francisco. The squad is formed by Commander Zund with the intention of training cadets to meet the new challenges of their time.

Main characters
Commander Kyethn Zund
Cadet Nog
Cadet Kamilah Goldstein
Cadet Matthew Decker
Cadet T'Priell
Cadet Edam Astrun
Cadet Pava Ek'noor Aqabaa

Production crew
Based on Star Trek created by Gene Roddenberry
Primary writers: Christian Cooper
Primary pencil artist: Chris Renaud (alternately John Royle)
Primary ink artist: Andy Lanning (alternately Tom Wegrzyn)

Issues

External links
Star Trek: Starfleet Academy page at Non-Canon Star Trek Wiki

Starfleet Academy
Marvel Comics titles
Comics based on television series
1996 comics debuts
1998 comics endings
Fiction set in the 24th century